Fredrik Austbø (born 20 April 1988) is a Norwegian snowboarder with the specialty of half-pipe. He competed in the 2006 Winter Olympics and was once on an FIS World Cup podium. He is set to compete for Norway at the 2010 Winter Olympics in the Men's Halfpipe.

References 

Norwegian male snowboarders
Snowboarders at the 2006 Winter Olympics
Snowboarders at the 2010 Winter Olympics
1988 births
Living people
Olympic snowboarders of Norway
21st-century Norwegian people